2016 Regional League Division 2 Northern Division is the eighth season of the League competition since its establishment in 2009. It is in the third tier of the Thai football league system.

Changes from last season

Team changes

Promoted clubs

Lampang were promoted to the 2016 Thai Division 1 League.

Relegated clubs

Phichit were relegated from the 2015 Thai Division 1 League.

Withdrawn clubs

Lopburi have withdrawn from the 2016 campaign.

Moved clubs

Loei City R-Airlines and Nong Bua Pitchaya were moved from the North Eastern Region 2015.
Nakhon Sawan were moved into the Central Region 2016.
Phichit authorize to Ayutthaya Warrior in Central Region 2016

Stadium and locations

League table

Results

Season statistics

Top scorers
As of 3 September 2016.

See also
 2016 Thai Premier League
 2016 Thai Division 1 League
 2016 Regional League Division 2
 2016 Thai FA Cup
 2016 Thai League Cup
 2016 Kor Royal Cup

References

External links
 Division 2
 http://www.thailandsusu.com/webboard/index.php/topic,368602.0.html

Regional League Northern Division seasons